Trident 2 may refer to:

Dennis Trident 2, bus manufactured in England between 1997 and 2018
Hawker Siddeley Trident 2E, aeroplane manufactured in England in the 1960s
Trident II, a submarine-launched ballistic missile
Trident 2, a design found in public housing blocks of Hong Kong